Mississippi Highway 3 (MS 3) is a north–south Mississippi state highway, located entirely within the Mississippi Delta region, running from Redwood to Lake Cormorant, both at an intersection with U.S. Route 61 (US 61). For much of its duration, MS 3 is overlapped (concurrent) with U.S. Route 49W (US 49W).

Route description

MS 3 begins in northern Warren County in the Redwood community at an interchange with US 61 along the banks of the Yazoo River. It heads northeast, paralleling the river, as a two-lane highway for several miles along the western edge of a hilly plateau, which marks the eastern boundary of the Mississippi Delta, to cross into Yazoo County.

MS 3 continues northeast to pass through Satartia, where it meets MS 433, before passing through more rural areas (passing just west of Tinsley) to enter the Yazoo City city limits. The highway bypasses downtown along its west side, where it has an interchange with MS 16/MS 149. MS 3 now comes to an interchange with US 49W, which it becomes concurrent with and follows northward as a four-lane divided highway to pass through farmland for several miles, crossing over the Yazoo River, before entering Humphreys County just southwest of Carter.

US 49W/MS 3 now cross over the Will M. Whittington Auxiliary Channel and Lake Atchaflya before passing through Silver City and having an intersection with MS 149. The highway continues north, paralleling the Yazoo River, to pass through Belzoni, where it bypasses downtown along its west side and has a short concurrency with MS 12 and an intersection with MS 7. US 49W/MS 3 continue northwest to pass through Isola, where it has an intersection with unsigned MS 806 (Belzoni Street) and crosses over Lake Dawson, before entering Sunflower County.

The highway passes through Caile and Inverness, where it intersects another section of MS 149, before MS 3 splits off near Baird. MS 3 heads northeast as a two-lane highway to pass just south of Baird before curving directly north to pass directly through downtown Moorhead, where it has an intersection with US 82 at the northern edge of town. The highway continues north through farmland for several miles to cross the Quiver River before rejoining US 49W on the south side of the town of Sunflower (with US 49W being a two-lane highway this time). The highway bypasses Sunflower along it southern and eastern sides before passing through Dwyer and Blaine. US 49W/MS 3 passes through Doddsville, where it has a short concurrency with MS 442 and intersects unsigned MS 832, and Cottondale before passing through Ruleville, where it has an intersection with unsigned MS 812 and MS 8. The highway passes through Drew, where it intersects unsigned MS 820, before passing by the Mississippi State Penitentiary, where it has an intersection with MS 32. US 49W/MS 3 pass through Rome before entering Tallahatchie County.

The highway passes northeast through rural areas for several miles before entering Tutwiler and US 49W comes to an end at a Y-Intersection/interchange between US 49 and US 49E, with MS 3 continuing north along US 49. MS 3 follows US 49 north for not even a half mile before splitting off and heading northeast to cross into Quitman County at the community of Vance.

MS 3, now also known as Charley Pride Highway, heads through farmland to cross some small Bayous as it passes through the community of Denton, where it becomes concurrent with MS 322, and the town of Lambert, where MS 322 splits off. The highway now passes through the town of Marks, where it has an intersection with US 278/MS 6, before crossing the Coldwater River (which it also begins paralleling) and passing through the community of Hinchcliff and the towns of Darling, Falcon, and Sledge (with Sledge being where MS 3 has intersections with both MS 714 and MS 315). MS 3 now enters Panola County.

MS 3 passes through the town of Crenshwaw, where it has an intersection with MS 310, before passing through wooded areas for several miles as it travels through the Askew community before entering Tate County.

The highway passes through the community of Sarah before reentering farmland at intersection with MS 4, which it becomes concurrent with. MS 3/MS 4 now turn northwest to pass through the community of Savage and cross the Coldwater River for a second time to enter Tunica County. The highway immediately comes to a large interchange, where MS 3 splits of and heads due north.

MS 3 heads through farmland for several miles to pass through the communities of Prichard and Banks, where it has an intersection with MS 713, before entering Desoto County.

The highway now has a partial interchange with MS 304 before coming to an end shortly thereafter at an intersection with US 61 along the south side of the community of Lake Cormorant.

Major intersections

See also

References

003
Transportation in Warren County, Mississippi
Transportation in Yazoo County, Mississippi
Transportation in Humphreys County, Mississippi
Transportation in Sunflower County, Mississippi
Transportation in Tallahatchie County, Mississippi
Transportation in Quitman County, Mississippi
Transportation in Panola County, Mississippi
Transportation in Tate County, Mississippi
Transportation in Tunica County, Mississippi
Transportation in DeSoto County, Mississippi